Ben Schwietert (born 16 February 1997) is a Dutch competitive swimmer who specializes in freestyle.

Career
Schwietert participated in his first international championships at the 2015 European Short Course Championships in Netanya, Israel. He was eliminated in the heats of the 50, 100, and 200 meter freestyle. In the 4×50 m mixed freestyle relay, he won the bronze medal together with Jesse Puts, Inge Dekker, and Ranomi Kromowidjojo.

At the 2016 European Aquatics Championships in London, he won the gold medal in the 4 × 100 m mixed freestyle relay together with Sebastiaan Verschuren, Maud van der Meer, and Kromowidjojo. He also won a gold medal in the 4 × 200 meter freestyle relay for swimming in the heats. Individually Schwietert competed in the 100 meter freestyle.

Schwietert qualified for the 2016 Summer Olympics in Rio de Janeiro in the 4 × 200 meter freestyle relay. He swam in the heats and helped the relay team qualify for the final, where it finished 7th.

Personal life
Schwietert was born in the Netherlands, but between ages 1 to 14 he lived abroad with his family. He learned to swim in Moscow, Russia, and started swimming competitively in Shanghai, China. In 2011 he moved back to the Netherlands.

References

External links
Personal website

1997 births
Living people
Dutch male freestyle swimmers
Olympic swimmers of the Netherlands
Swimmers at the 2016 Summer Olympics
European Aquatics Championships medalists in swimming
World Aquatics Championships medalists in swimming
Sportspeople from Nijmegen
20th-century Dutch people
21st-century Dutch people